Nikolay Gromov (born 11 October 1929) was a Soviet sailor. He competed in the Dragon event at the 1972 Summer Olympics.

References

External links
 

1929 births
Possibly living people
Soviet male sailors (sport)
Olympic sailors of the Soviet Union
Sailors at the 1972 Summer Olympics – Dragon
Place of birth missing (living people)